A fashion week is a fashion industry event, lasting approximately one week, where fashion designers, brands or "houses" display their latest collections in runway fashion shows to buyers and the media. These events influence the upcoming fashion trends for the current and approaching seasons.

The most prominent fashion weeks are held in the fashion capitals of the world—  in chronological order, New York (Manhattan), London, Milan, and Paris, or the "Big Four", with exquisite fashion heritage, structured organization, and the most vaunted fashion designers of the last century, the four cities considered the main fashion capitals of the 21st century, and which receive the majority of press coverage.

During 2010s, fashion globalization contributed significantly to the rise of non-traditional fashion cities to significant relevance in the fashion calendar, in addition to the Big Four, other notable fashion weeks are held in Berlin, Madrid, Shanghai, São Paulo, and Tokyo.

History 
One of history's first signs of a fashion week, or seasonal collection, can be traced back to fashion designer Charles Frederick Worth. The concept of the fashion week began in Paris, when marketers used to hire women to wear couture items in public places, from racetracks to beauty salons. These parades gradually became social events of their own. In France, runway shows are still called "défilés de mode" which when translated literally means "fashion parades." A style show is an occasion placed on by a style planner to exhibit their forthcoming line of dress as well as embellishments during Fashion Week. Style shows debut each season, especially the Spring/Summer and Fall/Winter seasons. In 1903, a Manhattan shop called Ehrich Brothers put on what is thought to have been the country's first fashion show to lure middle-class women into the store. By 1910, many big department stores were holding shows of their own. It is likely that American retailers saw the "fashion parades" in couture salons, and decided to use the idea. These "parades" were an effective way to promote stores, and improve their status. By the 1920s, the fashion show had been used by retailers across the country. They were staged, and often held in the shop's restaurant during lunch or teatime. These shows were usually more theatrical than those of today, heavily based upon a single theme, and accompanied with a narrative commentary. The shows were hugely popular, enticing crowds in their thousands – crowds so large, that stores in New York in the 1950s had to obtain a license to have live models.

On July 19, 1943, the first-ever "fashion week," New York Fashion Week, was held, with one main purpose: to give fashion buyers alternatives to French fashion during World War II, when workers in the fashion industry were unable to travel to Paris.

The first Paris fashion week began in 1973.

Until 1994, shows were held in different locations, such as hotels, or lofts. From 1994 to 2009, the event was held in a tent at Bryant Park, behind the New York Public Library. Lincoln Center was the Fashion Week venue from 2010 to 2015, after which it moved to Clarkson Square, an events venue in SoHo in Manhattan.

In many fashion shows worldwide, celebrities notoriously throw tantrums, which steal the show from the fashion itself. These displays are now famously known as "show stealers".

About

Although there are many notable fashion weeks around the world, only four are known as the "Big Four": in chronological order, New York, London, Milan, and Paris.  Paris began holding couture shows in 1945, Milan Fashion Week was founded by the Italian Chamber of Commerce in 1958, Paris Fashion Week was further organized in 1973 under the French Fashion Federation, and London Fashion Week was founded by the British Fashion Council in 1984.  Although these key organizations still organize the main shows, there are independent events and producers in all cities, as well.

Display content and style
There are primarily two kinds of shows, those of womenswear and menswear. There are also shows particular to each location. For example, most haute couture shows are held in Paris, while most business and sales-oriented shows and some haute couture shows take place in New York.

Paris' haute couture shows take place in January and July. Due to rules set down by the Chambre Syndicale de la Haute Couture, haute couture shows in France can only be held in Paris.

Recent designers have increasingly shown inter-seasonal collections between the traditional Autumn/Winter and Spring/Summer seasons. These collections are usually more commercial than the main season collections and help shorten the customer's wait for new season clothes. The inter-seasonal collections are Resort/Cruise (before Spring/Summer) and Pre-Fall (before Autumn/Winter). There is no fixed schedule for these shows in any of the major fashion capitals, but they typically happen three months after the main season shows. Some designers show their inter-seasonal collections outside their home city. For example, Karl Lagerfeld has shown his Resort and Pre-Fall collections for Chanel in cities such as Moscow, Los Angeles, and Monte Carlo instead of Paris. Many designers also put on presentations as opposed to traditional shows during Resort and Pre-Fall either to cut down costs or because they feel the clothes can be better understood in this medium.

Some fashion weeks can be genre-specific, such as Rio Summer fashion week, which focuses on swimwear. Miami has a week dedicated to swimwear which is called Miami swim week and it happens separately to Miami Fashion Week, the haute couture shows in Paris which display one-of-a-kind designer originals, and Indonesia Islamic Fashion Week for Muslim fashion. Bangalore Fashion Week displays festive wear and Bridal Fashion Week, while Portland (Oregon, USA) Fashion Week showcases some eco-friendly designers. Bread and Butter Berlin hosts the leading fashion show for everyday fashion.

See now, buy now
In recent years, shows have begun to feature garments that are available for sale immediately, online or in stores.
The other move has been to "see now, buy now" shows, often featuring clickable video, where looks are available online immediately following, or even during the show. "See now, buy now" experiences have included shows from Tom Ford, Nicole Miller, Moschino and Tommy Hilfiger. For example, in 2019 at the Tommy x Zendaya show, Hilfiger commented on the innovation of the "see now, buy now" concept.

The advent of "see now, buy now" shopping has also come about in response to so-called "fast fashion" retailers, who copy designs from the runway and bring them to retail faster than traditional design houses.

In spite of the call to rethink the runways with the idea "see now, buy now," as of 2017, the French Federation of Fashion has opposed the change.

Timing  

Fashion week happens twice a year in the major fashion capitals of the world; New York (February 7–15), London (February 15–19), Milan (February 19–25), and Paris (February 25-March 5).

Traditionally, fashion weeks were held several months in advance of the season to allow the press and buyers a chance to preview fashion designs for the following season. In February and March, designers showcased their autumn and winter collections. In September and October, designers showcased their spring and summer collections.

This timing was largely created to follow the then slower "retail cycle." In other words, it allowed time for retailers to purchase and incorporate the designers into their retail marketing. However, as customer expectations have increased, the retail cycle has increased. As a result, in 2016, designers started moving to "in-season shows."

See also 
 List of fashion events
 Fashion show
 Runway (fashion)
 Fashion
 Haute couture
 Ready-to-wear

References

External links 

 Fashion Shows at Vogue
 Fashion week calendar at DNMAG